Izabella Miko (born Izabella Anna Mikołajczak; 21 January 1981) is a  Polish actress, dancer, film producer, and environmental activist. She is best known for starring in the film Coyote Ugly and the music videos "Mr. Brightside" and "Miss Atomic Bomb" by The Killers. While a dance student in Poland, Miko was recruited to study at the New York City Ballet at age 15 and later studied acting at the Lee Strasberg Institute. She made her American film debut in Coyote Ugly (2000), followed by a starring part in the vampire thriller The Forsaken (2001).

Miko has also had recurring roles on the television series Deadwood, The Cape, and Chicago Fire, in addition to roles in dance films such as Save the Last Dance 2 (2006), Make Your Move (2013), and Step Up: All In (2014). She made her debut as a film producer on the British biographical drama Desert Dancer in 2014. She is also known as an environmental activist. She has a sustainable candle line named EkoMiko Candles as well as an eco foundation named EkoMiko.

Early life
Miko was born Izabella Anna Mikołajczak in Łódź, Poland, the daughter of actors Grażyna Dyląg and Aleksander Mikołajczak. She grew up in Warsaw, where she studied to be a ballerina at the Chopin Music School. An American choreographer invited her to study in New York City on a scholarship with the School of American Ballet, and she later enrolled at the Lee Strasberg Institute to study acting. After sustaining a back injury, Miko left New York City and returned to Poland.

Career
In the late 1990s, Miko returned to the United States and landed her first major film role in Coyote Ugly in 2000. This was followed with a lead role in the 2001 vampire horror film The Forsaken, playing a young woman infected by a vampiric virus. In 2005, Miko appeared in a multi-episode story arc on the HBO series Deadwood; the same year, she appeared in the music video for "Mr. Brightside" by The Killers (she again collaborated with the band for the video of their 2012 single "Miss Atomic Bomb", breaking her foot during filming). In 2006, she had a lead role in Save the Last Dance 2, replacing Julia Stiles from the original film.

Miko appeared in several independent films in the late 2000s, including Park (2007) and the comedy Flakes (2007), the latter of which premiered at the South by Southwest Film Festival. The following year, she appeared as a seductive nightclub singer in Dark Streets (2008), an adaptation of the play of the same name by Glenn M. Stewart. She also appeared in the crime thriller Double Identity (2009) in a lead role and in the big-budget remake Clash of the Titans (2010) as Athena. She was also in a supporting role as an acrobat named Raia in the television series The Cape, followed by a supporting role as a spy in the British war thriller Age of Heroes, based on the formation of Ian Fleming's No. 30 Commando during World War II.

In 2012, Miko appeared opposite Danny Huston and Sienna Miller in the period drama Two Jacks, directed by Bernard Rose, and in the South Korean movie Make Your Move in 2013. Miko appeared in Billy Idol's music video for "Can't Break Me Down", and also had a supporting role in Step Up: All In, both in 2014. Also in 2014, she had a small role in the TV show Supernatural, episode "Ask Jeeves" of season 10, where she portrays a shape shifter working for a rich heiress who has died. In 2015, Miko co-produced the biographical film Desert Dancer, which tells the story of Iranian choreographer Afshin Ghaffarian. The same year, she had guest appearances on the television series Blue Bloods and Scorpion as well as a recurring role on the action-drama series Chicago Fire.

Personal life
Miko supports green politics and keeps a video blog titled "Eko Miko". She has supported Global Green USA, an environmentalist group and organization that constitutes the American branch of Green Cross International. She is vegan.

Filmography

Film

Television

Music videos

References

External links

1981 births
Actors from Łódź
Living people
Polish child actresses
Polish female dancers
Polish film actresses
Polish television actresses
Polish emigrants to the United States
21st-century Polish actresses
Polish environmentalists
Polish women environmentalists